The 1969 Úrvalsdeild karla was the 18th season of the top tier men's basketball league on Iceland, then known as 1. deild karla. The season started on January 19, 1969 and ended on April 9, 1969.

ÍR won their ninth title by beating KR in an extra game for the championship after the two teams ended tied for the top place in the league.

ÍS got relegated after losing an extra game against KFR, 61–69.

Competition format
The participating teams played each other twice for a total of 10 games. The top team won the national championship. If two teams were tied at the top at the end of the season, they would have to play an extra game to decide the national championship.

Regular season

Extra games

References

External links
Official Icelandic Basketball Federation website

Úrvalsdeild karla (basketball)